Mu-crystallin homolog also known as NADP-regulated thyroid-hormone-binding protein (THBP) is a protein that in humans is encoded by the CRYM gene. Multiple alternatively spliced transcript variants have been found for this gene.

Function 

Crystallins are separated into two classes: taxon-specific and ubiquitous. The former class is also called phylogenetically-restricted crystallins. The latter class constitutes the major proteins of vertebrate eye lens and maintains the transparency and refractive index of the lens. This gene encodes a taxon-specific crystallin protein that binds NADPH and has sequence similarity to bacterial ornithine cyclodeaminases. The encoded protein does not perform a structural role in lens tissue, and instead it binds thyroid hormone for possible regulatory or developmental roles.

Its enzyme function has been determined as a ketimine reductase, reducing cyclic ketimines to their reduced forms. Either NADH or NADPH can be used as cofactor. The most active substrate at pH 5.0 is aminoethylcysteine ketimine (AECK), however at neutral pH (pH 7.2) the most active substrate is 1-piperideine-2-carboxylate which is an important part of the pipecolic acid pathway. The active form of thyroxine, T3, has been found to be a potent inhibitor at nanomolar concentrations.

Besides its role in lens biology, CRYM seems also to be involved in thyroid hormone signalling in other tissues. It could be demonstrated that CRYM mutations may cause deafness through thyroid hormone binding effects on the fibrocytes of the cochlea. Disruption of the CRYM gene leads to decreased T3 concentrations in both tissues and serum without alteration of peripheral T3 action in vivo.

The existence of intracellular thyroid hormone binding proteins has been postulated from mathematical modelling of pituitary-thyroid homeostasis. Binding properties have been assumed to be similar to those of extracellular binding proteins, however it is not clear, if THBP is the only intracellular thyroid hormone binding protein.

References

External links

Further reading

Thyroid